Bug spray may refer to:

 Insect repellent
 Insecticides or other pesticides that kill "bugs" or arthropods. 
 It can also mean some kind of fumigant